Nasha may refer to:

Nasha (film), 2013 Indian film
Nasha (2015 film), 2015 Pakistani film
NaSHA, a hash function

People with the name
Margaret Nasha, a politician from Botswana
Nasha Aziz, Malaysian actor and model

See also
Nasha Niva, Belarusian newspaper
Nasha Slova, Belarusian newspaper
Nasha Russia, Russian sketch show
Pehla Nasha, film
Naya Nasha, film
Halka Nasha, Hindi ghazal album